This is a list of Baroque palaces and residences built in the late 17th and 18th centuries. Baroque architecture is a building style of the Baroque era, begun in late 16th-century Italy and spread in Europe. The style took the Roman vocabulary of Renaissance architecture and used it in a new rhetorical and theatrical fashion, often to express the triumph of the Catholic Church and the absolutist state in defiance of the Reformation.

Baroque architecture often includes fragmentary or deliberately incomplete architectural elements, opulent use of colour and ornaments and an external façade often characterized by a dramatic central projection. Many European palaces drew inspiration from the Palace of Versailles started in 1682, which had previously been inspired by the Buen Retiro Palace, making it one of the most imitated buildings of the 17th century.

This list includes important city residences, such as the Stockholm Palace and Winter Palace, but does not extend to pre-Versailles Roman palazzi, such as Palazzo Altieri, Palazzo Barberini, or Palazzo Ludovisi.

References

Residences
 
Baroque